This is an incomplete list of lakes of Hungary.

See also

 List of rivers of Hungary

Hungary
Lakes